The Ape of Naples is the final studio album by English experimental group Coil. It was released on 2 December 2005 in the UK and Thailand by Threshold House, and has subsequently been reissued by multiple labels since. The album was a definitive effort by primary Coil member Peter Christopherson to rework and remix material from 1993 to 2004 into a coherent final record. It was produced and released following the death of co-lead artist and lead vocalist John Balance, who died on 13 November 2004, and the album was released in memory of him.

Background and composition

The Ape of Naples is composed of reworked material that Coil had created in varying forms since the inception of Backwards, their aborted Nothing Records album created during a period that Christopherson dubbed "the New Orleans era", as well as songs that were previously only played live in improvisational form on the mini-tours Coil undertook in the early 2000s. The title of the album was originally intended to be Fire of the Mind, which then became the title of the first track. "The Last Amethyst Deceiver" is the "final version" of "Amethyst Deceivers", which began when it was originally released on Autumn Equinox: Amethyst Deceivers; "It's In My Blood" was performed under the original name of "A.Y.O.R."; and "Going Up", the last song on the album, samples Balance's vocals spoken on stage live from Coil's final performance at the Dublin Electronic Arts Festival in 2004: Christopherson remarked that Coil's performance of "Going Up" at the festival was "the one and only time John thought of and sang those words... His own epitaph if you like."

Christopherson created the album with awareness of his own grief after Balance's death in November 2004; with the material he reworked taking on new meanings that he saw throughout the album's production, he felt he didn't "think [he] could have done it any better, so in that sense [he felt] fulfilled, and [was] sure John would feel so, too."
Songs from the New Orleans era which HAD not seemed to have "found their time" suddenly took on a completely new aspect, because of John's death. Miraculously, they changed, morphed, in front of my eyes, and I had numerous "oh my god—THAT's what that's about" revelatory moments. I imagine everyone does, listening to the album knowing what happened, in a way.

Reception

The Ape of Naples was well-received by music critics. Pitchfork reviewer Matthew Murphy gave the album a rating of 7.9/10 and described it as "a remarkably unified work, its every meditative gesture alloyed with a looming, unmistakable sense of impending loss and/or transition". AllMusic reviewer James Mason described it as "one of Coil's best albums and one of the best albums of 2005" and described listening to the album as "a bittersweet experience".

Track listing

CD pressing

Vinyl pressing 

Limited edition copies came with a copy of The New Backwards as a fourth piece of vinyl.

Personnel 
 Artwork, photography: Ian Johnstone
 Hurdy-gurdy – Cliff Stapleton
 Keyboards – Thighpaulsandra
 Marimba – Tom Edwards
 Orchestral stylings – Thighpaulsandra (track 5 & 6)
 Performer, sequenced by, sound designer, producer – Peter Christopherson
 Pipes, duduk – Mike York
 Synthesizer – Ossian Brown
 Vocals – John Balance (all), François Testory (track 11)
 Written by, recorded by, producer – Coil (all)

References

External links 
 
 
 The Ape of Naples at Brainwashed

2005 albums
Threshold House albums
Coil (band) albums
Albums published posthumously